The 2009 Melbourne Football Club season was the club's 110th year in the VFL/AFL since it began in 1897.

Melbourne hosted 10 of its 11 home games at the MCG. For the third year in a row, they played their remaining home game at Manuka Oval in the nation's capital, Canberra, against the Sydney Swans during Round 17. Dean Bailey coached his second year as senior coach at Melbourne. After taking the captaincy from David Neitz in round 6 the year before with Cameron Bruce, James McDonald was made full-time captain for the season.

On 2 August, Melbourne president Jim Stynes announced he was diagnosed with cancer and would be stepping aside from his duties until the conclusion of the 2009 AFL season. Don McLardy took over as acting president for that period of time.

Melbourne continued their Debt Demolition campaign in the month of August raising $567,132 and cutting their debt to $1.5 million. Melbourne also had a yearly profit of $587,183.

Melbourne only won four matches for the year, receiving their 12th wooden spoon. Melbourne came under scrutiny in the later rounds of the season (most notably in round 18 against Richmond) for "tanking", i.e. losing games in order to receive a priority draft pick; but, after extensive investigations in 2012 and 2013, the AFL found the club not guilty of these allegations. Because the Demons won four games or fewer for the second year in a row, the club received a priority pick at the start of the 2009 National Draft.

2009 list changes

Retirements and delistings

National draft

Pre-season draft

Rookie draft

2009 squad

2009 season

Pre-season

NAB Cup and NAB Challenge

Week 1

Practice Matches

Week 2

Week 3

Week 4

Home and away season

Round 1

Round 2

Round 3

Round 4

Round 5

Round 6

Round 7

Round 8

Round 9

Round 10

Round 11

Round 12

Round 13

Round 14

Round 15

Round 16

Round 17

Round 18

Round 19

Round 20

Round 21

Round 22

Notable matches

NAB Cup and NAB Challenge
Week 1: Melbourne looked to be on the verge of causing an upset over the 2008 Premiers, Hawthorn, leading 1.8.8 (65) to 0.5.2 (32) at three-quarter time. However, the Hawks made a successful comeback, keeping the 2008 wooden spooners goal-less in the final quarter as Jarryd Roughead snatched the lead back for Hawthorn with a mark and a goal 30 seconds from full-time.

Home and away season
Round 4: Melbourne registered their first win of the season defeating a winless Richmond by 8 points. Despite holding a 31-point lead at half time, the Demons held off a fast finishing Tigers outfit in the final quarter to secure their first win against a Victorian team since round 22, 2007. It was also Melbourne's first win as the "away" side since round 14, 2007.

Round 10: Melbourne put up a brave first half effort against an undefeated St Kilda, trailing by only 8 points at the main break. However, the Saints kept Melbourne goalless in the second half to finish out comfortable winners by 27 points.

Round 11: In the Queen's Birthday clash, the 2008 number 1 draft pick Jack Watts made his debut against Collingwood. He received a harsh welcoming to the AFL when he came off from the interchange bench for the first time in the game: Watts was immediately crunched by the larger bodies of three Collingwood players while the ball came his direction, as Melbourne suffered its biggest loss for the season (66 points).

Round 12: Liam Jurrah (the first AFL player from a remote tribal community) made his AFL debut, against Essendon. He kicked his first goal with a marking attempt that turned into a falling crumb in the goal-square. This goal was nominated for Goal of the Year. Melbourne were out-classed by the Bombers, losing easily by 48 points.

Round 14: On 2 July, in an emotional press conference, Melbourne president Jim Stynes announced that he was diagnosed with cancer and had to step down as president for the rest of the season. Melbourne played its most emotional game of the year against West Coast and recorded its highest first quarter score of the season. Despite a late charge by the Eagles in the final quarter, Melbourne resisted the attack and won the game by 20 points. After the match, the players headed into the dressing rooms holding up Stynes' infamous number 37 guernsey, which he wore during the 1987 Preliminary Final against Hawthorn. Jack Grimes received the NAB Rising Star nomination for round 14.

Round 15: Melbourne won consecutive games for the first time since round 11, 2007 when it downed Port Adelaide by 11 points, after holding a 30-point lead midway through the third quarter. Liam Jurrah received the NAB Rising Star nomination for Round 15.

Round 18: In a match that was criticised for tanking strategies, Jordan McMahon took a mark in Richmond's forward 50 and goaled after the final siren to give the Tigers a 4-point win. During the game Melbourne coach Dean Bailey placed several players in unusual positions. These included placing ruckman Paul Johnson and midfielder James McDonald in the backline; playing forward Brad Miller in the ruck; placing defenders James Frawley and Matthew Warnock in the forward line, as well as leaving Russell Robertson and Colin Sylvia out of the game for Michael Newton and rookie Jake Spencer.

Round 20: In front of a crowd of only 13,004, Melbourne inflicted its only thrashing of the season against fellow cellar dwellers Fremantle after a blowout in the second quarter to win by 63 points. They would record its first 60-point victory since round 8, 2006 as well as the first time they scored 20 or more goals in a game since round 22, 2007.

Round 22: Veterans Russell Robertson, Paul Wheatley and Matthew Whelan played their last ever AFL match, against ladder leaders St Kilda. Melbourne put on another strong first half performance, trailing by only a goal at half time, which included a backwards goal from Liam Jurrah at the start of the quarter. However, St Kilda ran over the top of Melbourne in the second half, winning comfortably by 47 points to secure the minor premiership. Melbourne, on the other hand, received the wooden spoon and ensured that their priority pick would be safe. They had the first and second picks in the 2009 AFL draft.

Ladder

Ladder breakdown by opposition

Brownlow Medal

Brownlow Medal tally

Awards

Keith 'Bluey' Truscott Medal tally (top 10)

Keith 'Bluey' Truscott Trophy – Aaron Davey

Sid Anderson Memorial Trophy (Second in the Best and Fairest) – Brent Moloney

Ron Barassi Snr Memorial Trophy (Third in the Best and Fairest) – Cameron Bruce

Ivor Warne-Smith Memorial Trophy (Fourth in the Best and Fairest) – Matthew Bate

Dick Taylor Memorial Trophy (Fifth in the Best and Fairest) – Nathan Jones, Colin Sylvia, Matthew Warnock

Harold Ball Memorial Trophy (Best First Year Player) – Liam Jurrah

Troy Broadbridge Trophy (highest polling MFC player in the Casey Best and Fairest) – Shane Valenti

Ron Barassi Leadership Award – Brent Moloney

Ian Ridley Club Ambassador Award – Shane Valenti

Norm Smith Memorial Trophy (Coach's Award) – James Frawley

Leading Goalkicker Award – Russell Robertson (29)

References

External links
 Official Website of the Melbourne Football Club
 Official Website of the AFL 

Melbourne Football Club Season, 2009
2009
Melbourne Football Club